The Teatro Re was a theatre in Milan, located near the Piazza del Duomo and named for its proprietor, Carlo Re. It functioned as both a prose theatre and an opera house and saw the world premieres of numerous operas, including four by Giovanni Pacini. Designed by Luigi Canonica, the theatre was inaugurated in 1813, closed in 1872, and demolished in 1879.

History
The Teatro Re was named for its proprietor, Carlo Re, a Milanese businessman and impresario who in his early days had been a shoemaker. Designed by Luigi Canonica, the theatre was built on the site of the demolished church of San Salvatore in Xenodochio which had been established in the late 8th century as the chapel for Milan's first orphanage. The building of the theatre began in 1812 and was completed the following year. It was inaugurated on 18 December 1813 with a new production of Rossini's opera Tancredi.  Three months later, the first play was presented, Marie-Joseph Chénier's Fénelon performed by the Ciarli company.

Less than half the size of La Scala (Milan's main opera house), the Teatro Re had an overall seating capacity of 1000 arranged over an upper balcony, three tiers of boxes, and eight rows of seats on the floor of the auditorium. Its lavish interior was designed and decorated by Alessandro Sanquirico. The curtain, which depicted the Judgement of Paris, was painted by Pasquale Canna, who like Sanquirico, also worked as a set painter and designer for La Scala. The interior of the theatre was refurbished and re-painted in 1836. According to the Italian writer, Marcello Mazzoni (1801–1853), it was long overdue. He wrote the previous year that while the theatre "possesses all the advantages required for the good performance of a comedy, [...] it wants cleansing, for it cannot be more wretchedly dirty."

From its early days, the theatre was well attended, due partly to its central location but also to its varied repertoire that alternated between opera (both buffa and seria) and plays. It also became a popular gathering place for Milanese intellectuals and patriots. The Teatro Re hosted over 20 world premieres of operas and ballets between 1814 and 1848 and saw performances by some of Italy's most prominent theatre companies, including those of Carlotta Marchionni, Gaetana Goldoni, and Vestri & Venier.

In 1846 Carlo Re ceded management of the theatre to the actor  and later to the former singer Teresa Cesarani. During the revolution of 1848, the theatre's repertoire oriented towards works with patriotic themes, such as Silvio Pellico's play Francesca da Rimini. The Palestra parlamentaria, a group of journalists, lawyers, and artists who supported the first Italian war of independence, held its first public meetings at the theatre in May 1848.

The Teatro Re's popularity began a slow decline in the second half of the 19th century, and it supplemented its theatrical and operatic productions with acrobatic and science shows. However, the correspondent for The Musical World wrote as late as 1866 that for drama "the only respectable theatre available [in Milan] is the Teatro Re, and this is so small that there is never any chance of obtaining a seat unless you are there at the time the doors are opened." Its operatic repertoire also remained adventurous with the theatre presenting the first Italian productions of Offenbach's La belle Hélène in 1867 and Félicien David's Lalla-Roukh in 1870.

The Teatro Re finally closed its doors on 5 June 1872. Its last performance was Rossini's The Barber of Seville. For a while some of its repertoire moved to the Nuovo Teatro Re (New Teatro Re) which had been opened in the Porta Ticinese district by Carlo Re's son Giovanni in 1864. Slightly larger but less elegant than the old Teatro Re, the Nuovo Teatro Re was in operation until 1887. The building of the original Teatro Re was acquired by the city of Milan and demolished in 1879 during the restructuring of the area around the newly built Galleria Vittorio Emanuele.

Opera premieres

 
Operas which had their world premieres at the Teatro Re include:
Evellina, opera seria in 2 acts composed by Carlo Coccia, libretto by Gaetano Rossi, 26 December 1814
La scoperta inaspettata, opera buffa in 2 acts composed by Carlo Bigatti, libretto by Francesco Marconi, 1 January 1815
Il matrimonio per procura, dramma giocoso in 1 act composed by Giovanni Pacini, libretto by Angelo Anelli, 2 January 1817
Dalla beffa il disinganno, dramma giocoso in 1 act composed by Giovanni Pacini, libretto by Angelo Anelli, 12 January 1817
Piglia il mondo come viene, dramma giocoso in 2 acts composed by Giovanni Pacini, libretto by Angelo Anelli, 28 May 1817
Adelaide e Comingio, opera semi-seria in 2 acts composed by Giovanni Pacini, libretto by Gaetano Rossi, 30 December 1817
 Il carnevale di Venezia, opera buffa in 2 acts composed by Francesco Boyle, libretto by Girolamo Canestrari, 21 January 1819
I furbi al cimento, opera buffa in 2 acts composed by Carlo Bigatti, libretto by Francesco Marconi, 13 February 1819
Marsia, opera in 2 acts composed by Giovanni Arcangelo Gambarana, libretto by "X.Y.Z.", 1 December 1819
La festa di Bussone, opera buffa in 2 acts composed by Michele Carafa, libretto by Silvio Pellico, 28 June 1820
I due sergenti, opera in 2 acts composed by Alberto Mazzucato, libretto by Felice Romani, 27 February 1841
Don Papirio sindaco, opera buffa in 2 acts composed by Giocondo Degola, libretto by Lazzaro Damezzano, 28 July 1841
Un duello alla pistola opera semi-seria in 2  acts composed by Giocondo Degola, libretto by Francesco Regli, 26 December 1841
Luigi V, re di Francia, opera seria in 3 acts, composed by Alberto Mazzucato, libretto by Felice Romani, 25 February 1843
Il borgomastro di Schiedam, opera buffa in 3 acts composed by Lauro Rossi, libretto by Giovanni Peruzzini, 1 June 1844
Le due sorelle di Corinto, opera in 3 acts composed by  Giuseppe Devasini, libretto by the composer based on Goethe's Die Braut von Corinth, 5 July 1846,
Ser Gregorio, dramma giocoso in 2 acts composed by Giovanni Consolini, librettist unknown, 7 February 1848
 Il testamento di Figaro, opera buffa in 2 acts composed by Antonio Cagnoni, libretto by Callisto Bassi, 26 February 1848
 Margherita, opera semi-seria in 2 acts composed by Jacopo Foroni, libretto by Giorgio Ciacchetti, 8 March 1848
Bianca di Belmonte, opera in 4 acts composed by Giuseppe Devasini, libretto by Alessandro Carozzi, 30 January 1853
Claudia, opera in 3 acts composed by Emanuele Muzio, libretto by Giulio Carcano, 7 February 1853

Notes

References

Further reading
Sanguinetti, Lamberto (1969). "Storia del teatro Re, 1813-1872". Città di Milano. Rassegna mensile del Comune e bollettino di statistica, Vol. 86, No. 5, pp. 10–159

Opera in Milan
Theatres in Milan
Theatres completed in 1813
Buildings and structures demolished in 1879
19th-century architecture in Italy